Feluda is an Indian-Bengali detective media franchise created by Indian-Bengali film director and writer Satyajit Ray, featuring the character, Feluda. The titular character is a private investigator starring in a series of Bengali novels and short stories. The detective resides at 21 Rajani Sen Road, Ballygunge, Kolkata, West Bengal, India. Feluda first made his appearance in a Bengali children's magazine called Sandesh (সন্দেশ) in 1965, under the editorialship of Satyajit and Subhas Mukhopadhyay. His first adventure was Feludar Goendagiri (ফেলুদার গোয়েন্দাগিরি).

Feluda is often accompanied by his cousin who unofficially is also his assistant Tapesh Ranjan Mitter (affectionately called Topshe by Feluda), who serves as the narrator of the stories. From the sixth story, Sonar Kella (The Golden Fortress), the duo is joined by a popular thriller writer Jatayu (Lalmohon Ganguli).

Feluda has had been filmed at times, with the character been played by Soumitra Chatterjee, Sabyasachi Chakrabarty, Shashi Kapoor, Abir Chatterjee, Parambrata Chatterjee, Ahmed Rubel and Tota Roy Chowdhury. Satyajit Ray directed two Feluda movies — Sonar Kella (সোনার কেল্লা) (1974) and Joi Baba Felunath (জয় বাবা ফেলুনাথ) (1978). Sandip Ray made a new Feluda film series (continuation of the original series) on Feluda's adventures which started from Baksho Rahashya (1996). In this series, he made ten TV films and six theatrical films in Bengali on the character. Sandip Ray also made a stand-alone Feluda film Badshahi Angti (2014) which was intended to be the first film of a reboot series, but the series was canceled and Sandip Ray came back to the previous film series.

Stories 
In the Feluda series there are 35 published and four unpublished stories. The list is chronologically arranged.

Color key
  indicates "story".
  indicates "novel".
  indicates unfinished writings.

Films

Film Series Timeline
The first two film of the series was directed by Satyajit Ray in the 70's and later films by his son Sandip Ray from the 90's till now. In the first two films Sonar Kella (1974) and Joi Baba Felunath (1978), Feluda was played by Soumitra Chatterjee. Sabyasachi Chakrabarty was playing the character from Baksho Rahashya (1996) to Double Feluda (2016).

Hindi movie based on Feluda
In September 2016, Sandip Ray sold the rights to Sonar Kella to Pradeep Sarkar. Pradeep is to remake Sonar Kella, directed by Satyajit Ray, in Hindi. Nothing has been announced about the casting.

Scripting of the Hindi adaptation of this cult detective story is currently in progress. Over the years, many in Bollywood have expressed their desire to make Feluda in general and Sonar Kella in particular. Director Shoojit Sircar was in the news for hoping to adapt Sonar Kella in Hindi. However, Sarkar finally walked away with the prized rights.

"Yes, it's true that I have bought the rights of 'Sonar Kella'. It will be inspired from 'Sonar Kella'. I have the Hindi rights to only this film and not the Feluda series. I am trying to make something very different. Once this script is ready, I will discuss it with Sandip Ray," Sarkar said.
	
Incidentally, no other director apart from the maestro himself and his son have ever directed a Feluda film in Bengali. Only Bibhas Chakraborty has made two Feluda telefilms. However, Sandip has been open to the idea of a good director adapting Feluda in Hindi. "I have given the rights of Baba's short story to Dibakar Banerjee. I have always maintained that if the director is competent, I am open to giving the Feluda rights in Hindi," he said.

According to Ray, the original names of the characters, including Feluda, Topshe, Jatayu, Mukul and Mandar Bose, will be changed in the Sarkar film. "I wanted to give the Hindi remake rights to a Bengali director. The advantage is that a Bengali director will have read the original book and watched the film. Things became very easy-going when Pradeep Sarkar met me to discuss this adaptation. It was a very warm and friendly meeting," Ray said, keeping the charges for remake rights a secret.

By 2017, Ray expected Sarkar to show him the screenplay. "As of now, we have had no discussions regarding the casting," Ray said. Will he want to collaborate with Sarkar once the Hindi film goes on the floor? "No, it will be his baby," Ray said.

Rumour of Hindi Feluda movie by Shoojit Sircar
In September 2013, director Shoojit Sircar told the Indian media that if he got any chance to remake Satyajit Ray's Sonar Kella for a worldwide audience, he would cast actor Aamir Khan as Feluda. However, in later years Sandip Ray confirmed that this would never happen, and Shoojit Sircar also stated he had told it as a joke, he was never serious about it and he had never thought of making a Feluda film. As of September 2016, according to media reports, director Shoojit Sircar was trying to acquire the rights to Sonar Kella.

Television

90s TV Films 
This films are the continuation of the Feluda original film series.

TV films and TV series of 1980s, early 1990s and 2010s 
These TV series and Telefilms are not part of the original Feluda film series which was directed by Satyajit Ray and his son Sandip Ray.

Streaming Television Series 
 Feluda (Directed by Parambrata Chatterjee)
A Bangladeshi streaming TV series "Feluda" from Bioscopelive streaming platform was directed by Parambrata Chatterjee who also played the title character along with Riddhi Sen playing Topshe was released in 2017–2018 in three seasons. This streaming TV series is not a part of the Feluda film canon directed by Satyajit Ray and Sandip Ray. 
Stories adapted were Sheyal Debota Rahasyo, Ghurghutiyar Ghotona, and Golokdham Rahasya and aired on Bioscopelive from September 2017. The series became available in India on digital platform Addatimes.

 Feluda Pherot (Directed by Srijit Mukherji) 
In 2020 a streaming television series was made, named ‘Feluda Pherot’ based on the iconic Bengali detective and there will be two popular stories, ‘Chhinnamastar Abhishap’ and 'Joto Kando Kathmandute'. Bengali actors Tota Roy Chowdhury is playing the main character 'Feluda' and Kalpan Mitra as 'Topesh' seemed to be his young assistant and the iconic character Lalmohan Ganguly, alias 'Jatayu' is playing by Anirban Chakraborty who played the main character in Detective Series Eken Babu before.

It is available to stream on the web platform addatimes. The song which has been sung by Rupankar Bagchi, Rupam Islam and Anupam Roy was out on 2 May 2020 on Srijit Mukherji's Facebook account and Anupam Roy's YouTube channel. The trailer of the Feluda Pherot Season 1 Chhinnamastar Abhishap is released on 21 November 2020 and the trailer of the Feluda Pherot Season 2 Joto Kando Kathmandute is released on 22 November 2020.The Season 1 released on 26 December 2020.

The second series named Feludar Goyendagiri is also under production from Hoichoi streaming service with the same cast and crew of Feluda Pherot. Darjeeling Jawmjawmat, the first season is slated to release on 17 June 2022.

Animated
 In 2010 an animated TV film produced by DQE Productions titled Feluda: The Kathmandu Caper was produced and the rights were acquired by Disney Channel (India). The movie premiered on 1 January 2011. DQE Productions also made a 13-episode animation series named Mysteries and Feluda after the animated TV film for Disney XD (India). The series including the TV film was set into a new universe, where Feluda, Topshe and Jatayu have many gadgets. The series is available on Amazon Prime Video India.

Documentary

A Bengali documentary film Feluda: 50 Years of Ray's Detective was directed by Sagnik Chatterjee. This is the first biopic of India based on a fictional character. This film was released on 7 June 2019. Sandip Ray and many cast members were featured in the film.

Cast and characters
<div class="overflowbugx" style="overflow:auto; width: 99%;">

</div class>

Awards

National Awards

Other awards

See also
 Tarini Khuro
 Tarini Khuro in other media
 Byomkesh Bakshi in other media
 Kakababu
 Kakababu in other media

References

Feluda (series)
Indian detective films
Films based on Indian novels
Television shows based on Indian novels
Indian crime television series